Bucculatrix diffusella is a moth in the family Bucculatricidae. It was described by Herbert Menhofer in 1943. It is found in south-western France.

The larvae feed on Artemisia maritima. They mine the leaves of their host plant. Young larvae are honey yellow with a brown head. The older larvae are yellowish olive green with a brown head.

References

Natural History Museum Lepidoptera generic names catalog

Bucculatricidae
Moths described in 1943
Moths of Europe
Leaf miners